Lieutenant General Sir Napier Crookenden  (31 August 1915 − 31 October 2002) was a British Army General who reached high office in the 1960s.

Military career
Educated at Wellington College and the Royal Military College, Sandhurst, Crookenden was commissioned into the Cheshire Regiment in 1935.

He served in the Second World War as a brigade major in the 6th Airlanding Brigade in 1943 planning and implementing glider assaults to secure bridges over the River Orne on the day of the Normandy landings. He served as commanding officer of 9th (Eastern and Home Counties) Parachute Battalion between 1944 and 1946 leading his regiment in the Battle of the Bulge and then the crossing of the River Rhine.

He was Director of Operations during the Malayan Emergency between 1952 and 1954 and served as Commander of 16th Parachute Brigade from 1960 to 1961. He went to the Imperial Defence College in 1962. He was appointed Director of Land/Air Warfare at the Ministry of Defence in 1964 and then Commandant at the Royal Military College of Science in Shrivenham in 1967. He became the last General Officer Commanding-in-Chief of Western Command in 1969 and retired in 1972.

Retirement

In retirement he became a Deputy Lieutenant for Kent. He was also a lecturer on military history on the P&O steamship SS Uganda.

Family
In 1948 he married Patricia Nassau, daughter of Hugh Kindersley, 2nd Baron Kindersley, and they went on to have two sons and two daughters.

Notable works

Bibliography

References

External links
 Imperial War Museum Interview

|-
 

1915 births
2002 deaths
British Army lieutenant generals
Knights Commander of the Order of the Bath
Companions of the Distinguished Service Order
Officers of the Order of the British Empire
Cheshire Regiment officers
Deputy Lieutenants of Kent
People educated at Wellington College, Berkshire
Graduates of the Royal Military College, Sandhurst
British Parachute Regiment officers
British Army personnel of the Malayan Emergency
British Army personnel of World War II
Kindersley family